Tonkinospira is a genus of air-breathing land snails, terrestrial pulmonate gastropod mollusks in the subfamily Hypselostomatinae  of the family Gastrocoptidae.

Species
 Tonkinospira chytrophora (Mabille, 1887)
 Tonkinospira crassicostata Páll-Gergely & Grego, 2019
 Tonkinospira danangensis Páll-Gergely & Grego, 2019
 Tonkinospira defixa (Bavay & Dautzenberg, 1912)
 Tonkinospira depressa (Jaeckel, 1950)
 Tonkinospira pauperrima (Bavay & Dautzenberg, 1909)
 Tonkinospira pulverea (Bavay & Dautzenberg, 1909)
 Tonkinospira raxajacki Páll-Gergely & Grego, 2019
 Tonkinospira suturata Páll-Gergely & Grego, 2019
 Tonkinospira tomasini Páll-Gergely & Jochum, 2017
 Tonkinospira triangulata Páll-Gergely & Grego, 2019

References

External links
 ochum, A.; Slapnik, R.; Kampschulte, M.; Martels, G.; Heneka, M.; Páll-Gergely, B. (2014). A review of the microgastropod genus Systenostoma Bavay & Dautzenberg, 1908 and a new subterranean species from China (Gastropoda, Pulmonata, Hypselostomatidae). ZooKeys. 410: 23-40
 Bavay, A. & Dautzenberg, P. (1909). Molluscorum terrestrium Tonkinorum diagnoses. Journal de Conchyliologie. 56(4): 229–251.
 Páll-Gergely, B., Grego, J., Vermeulen, J.J., Reischütz, A., Hunyadi, A. & Jochum, A. (2019). New Tonkinospira Jochum, Slapnik & Páll-Gergely, 2014 species from Laos and Vietnam (Gastropoda: Pulmonata: Hypselostomatidae). Raffles Bulletin of Zoology. 67: 517–535

Gastrocoptidae
Gastropod genera